Paddington, an electoral district of the Legislative Assembly in the Australian state of Queensland, was created in 1912 and abolished in 1932.


Election results

Elections in the 1920s

1929

1926

1923

1922 by-election

1920

Elections in the 1910s

1918

1915

1912

References

Former electoral districts of Queensland
Queensland state electoral results by district